Pramila Bohidar is an Indian politician from the Biju Janata Dal party. She is a Member of the Parliament of India representing Orissa in the Rajya Sabha, the upper house of the Indian Parliament.

References

External links
 Profile on Rajya Sabha website

Biju Janata Dal politicians
Rajya Sabha members from Odisha
Year of birth missing (living people)
Living people
Women in Odisha politics
Place of birth missing (living people)
Women members of the Rajya Sabha